Panic in Chicago is a 1931 German crime film directed by Robert Wiene and starring Olga Tschechowa, Hans Rehmann and Ferdinand Hart. It was based on the novel Panic in Chicago by the German writer Robert Heymann. The film was shot at the Staaken Studios with sets designed by the art director Erwin Scharf. It premiered at the Palast-am-Zoo in Berlin on 23 June 1931.

Synopsis
In 1930s mob-dominated Chicago, a leading gangster poses as a respectable member of society.

Cast
 Olga Tschechowa as Florence Dingley
 Hans Rehmann as Taglioni
 Ferdinand Hart as Percy Boot
 Hilde Hildebrand as Susy Owen
 Lola Chlud as Fay Davis
 Ernst Dumcke as Kommissar Renard
 William Trenk as Kriminalbeamter Charles
 Gerhard Bienert as Tom
 Friedrich Ettel as King
 Franz Weber as John
 Ernst Wurmser as Robert
 Arthur Bergen as Spieler

References

Bibliography

External links

1931 films
1931 crime films
German crime films
Films of the Weimar Republic
1930s German-language films
Films directed by Robert Wiene
Films about the Chicago Outfit
Films based on German novels
Films set in Chicago
German black-and-white films
Films shot at Staaken Studios
1930s German films